Willy de l'Arbre (31 May 1882 – 11 March 1952) was a Belgian sailor who competed in the 1920 Summer Olympics. He was a crew member of the Belgian boat Antwerpia V, which won the bronze medal in the 8-metre class (1919 rating).

References

External links
Willy de l'Arbre's profile at databaseOlympics.com
Willy de l'Arbre's profile at Sports Reference.com

1882 births
1952 deaths
Belgian male sailors (sport)
Sailors at the 1920 Summer Olympics – 8 Metre
Olympic sailors of Belgium
Olympic bronze medalists for Belgium
Olympic medalists in sailing
Medalists at the 1920 Summer Olympics